Kolach is the Slavonic term for a number of traditional baked products, such as:

Kolach (bread), a circular bread, most often made as a sweet dish
Slavski kolač, a Serbian variant of the kolach, made for the celebration of Slava
Kolach (cake), a Czech and Slovak sweet pastry different from the above

See also

Korovai